Palakurthi is a census town in Jangaon district in the Indian state of Telangana.

Demographics 
 India census, Palakurthi had a population of 6964. Males constitute 52% of the population and females 48%. Palakurthi has an average literacy rate of 56%, lower than the national average of 59.5%: male literacy is 66%, and female literacy is 46%. In Palakurthi, 13% of the population is under 6 years of age. Palakurthy town is famous for Sri Someshwara Laxminarasimha swamy temple which is located 1 km from town.

To reach Palakurthi by bus from Hyderabad, we need to go to Station Ghanpur or jangoan first from JBS or CBS.  From there we can get good frequency of buses to Palakurthi.

References 

Cities and towns in Jangaon district